The 2017 Thai FA Cup Final was the final match of the 2017 Thai FA Cup, the 24th season of a Thailand's football tournament organised by Football Association of Thailand. It was played at the Supachalasai Stadium in Bangkok, Thailand on 25 November 2017, between Chiangrai United a big team from the Northern part of Thailand and Bangkok United a big team from the metropolitan region.

Road to the final

In their semi-finals, Chiangrai United beat SCG Muangthong United on Penalty shoot-out 4–3 after extra time 120 minutes of 2–2 . In the same way, Bangkok United beat JL Chiangmai United 3–0 and qualified to the final.

Note: In all results below, the score of the finalist is given first (H: home; A: away; T1: Clubs from Thai League; T2: Clubs from Thai League 2; T4: Clubs from Thai League 4).

Match

Details

Assistant referees:
 Rachen Srichai
 Chaowalit Phoonprasit
Fourth official:
 Wiwat Jumpa-on
Match Commissioner:
 Paiboon Anyapo
Referee Assessor:
 Chalat Pirom

Winner

Prizes for winner
 A champion trophy.
 5,000,000 THB prize money.
 Qualification to 2018 AFC Champions League Preliminary round 2.
 Qualification to 2018 Thailand Champions Cup.

Prizes for runners-up
 1,000,000 THB prize money.

See also
 2017 Thai League
 2017 Thai League 2
 2017 Thai League 3
 2017 Thai League 4
 2017 Thai FA Cup
 2017 Thai League Cup

References

External links
Thai FA cup snapshot from Thai League official website

2017
1